Enghien is a city and municipality of Wallonia located in the province of Hainaut, Belgium. 

On 1January 2006, Enghien had a total population of 11,980.

The municipality consists of the following districts: Enghien, Marcq, and Petit-Enghien. It is situated on Flemish border, and restricted language rights are granted to the Dutch speaking minority (so-called language facilities).

History
Enghien gave its name to a French duchy and to the commune of Enghien-les-Bains, a suburb of Paris, due to a complex series of family successions: in 1487, Mary of Luxembourg (d. 1547), the only heir of Peter II of Luxembourg (d. 1482), Count of Saint-Pol-sur-Ternoise and member of one of the branches of the House of Luxembourg, married François de Bourbon-Vendôme (d. 1495), the great-grandfather of King Henry IV of France. Mary of Luxembourg brought as her dowry the fief of Condé-en-Brie (Aisne département, France) and the county of Enghien, among others. These fiefs passed to her grandson Louis I de Bourbon, Prince de Condé, uncle of King Henry IV of France, who started the line of the Princes of Condé, the famous cadet branch of the French royal family.

In 1566, the county of Enghien was elevated to a duchy-peerage. However, the necessary registration process was not completed, so the title became extinct at the death of Louis I de Bourbon in 1569. In 1633, Henry II, Prince of Condé, grandson of Louis I de Bourbon, inherited the duchy of Montmorency, near Paris, after the execution of Henri II de Montmorency, brother of his wife Charlotte-Marguerite de Montmorency. In 1689, King Louis XIV allowed Henry III, Prince of Condé, grandson of Henry II, Prince of Condé, to rename the duchy of Montmorency as "duchy of Enghien", in memory of the duchy of Enghien which the Princes of Condé had lost in 1569 at the death of Louis I de Bourbon.

The city of Montmorency, at the heart of the duchy, continued to be known as "Montmorency", despite the official name change, but the name "Enghien" stuck to the nearby lake and marshland that developed later as a spa resort and was incorporated as the commune of Enghien-les-Bains in the 19th century.

Image gallery

See also
 Qualitis Science Park

References

External links

 Official site
 Le carillon d'Enghien

 
Cities in Wallonia
Municipalities of Hainaut (province)
Wallonia's Major Heritage